is a Japanese badminton player who is a doubles specialist. She won the gold medal at the 2016 Summer Olympic women's doubles alongside Ayaka Takahashi. Despite playing doubles, she was also a finalist in girls' singles at the 2010 BWF World Junior Championships in Mexico.

Career overview 
In 2016, she won the women's doubles gold medal at the Summer Olympics in Rio de Janeiro, Brazil. She and her women's doubles partner Ayaka Takahashi were also honoured with the Female Player of the Year award. They have been playing together for more than ten years, ever since they were schoolmates. Matsutomo and Takahashi became the first pair from outside China to win the women's Olympic doubles title since the 1996 Atlanta Games, giving Japan its second medal in the event after Mizuki Fujii and Reika Kakiiwa took silver at the 2012 London Olympic Games.

Achievements

Olympic Games 
Women's doubles

BWF World Championships 
Women's doubles

Asian Games 
Women's doubles

Asian Championships 
Women's doubles

Mixed doubles

BWF World Junior Championships 
Girls' singles

BWF World Tour (6 titles, 7 runners-up) 
The BWF World Tour, which was announced on 19 March 2017 and implemented in 2018, is a series of elite badminton tournaments sanctioned by the Badminton World Federation (BWF). The BWF World Tour is divided into levels of World Tour Finals, Super 1000, Super 750, Super 500, Super 300 (part of the HSBC World Tour), and the BWF Tour Super 100.

Women's doubles

Mixed doubles

BWF Superseries (9 titles, 13 runners-up) 
The BWF Superseries, which was launched on 14 December 2006 and implemented in 2007, was a series of elite badminton tournaments, sanctioned by the Badminton World Federation (BWF). BWF Superseries levels were Superseries and Superseries Premier. A season of Superseries consisted of twelve tournaments around the world that had been introduced since 2011. Successful players were invited to the Superseries Finals, which were held at the end of each year.

Women's doubles

  BWF Superseries Finals tournament
  BWF Superseries Premier tournament
  BWF Superseries tournament

BWF Grand Prix (6 titles, 2 runners-up) 
The BWF Grand Prix had two levels, the Grand Prix and Grand Prix Gold. It was a series of badminton tournaments sanctioned by the Badminton World Federation (BWF) and played between 2007 and 2017.

Women's doubles

Mixed doubles

  BWF Grand Prix Gold tournament
  BWF Grand Prix tournament

BWF International Challenge/Series (2 titles, 4 runners-up) 
Women's singles

Women's doubles

Mixed doubles

  BWF International Challenge tournament
  BWF International Series tournament

Performance timeline

National team 
 Junior level

 Senior level

Individual competitions

Junior level  
 Girls' singles

 Mixed doubles

Senior level

Women's singles

Women's doubles

Mixed doubles

References

External links 

 
 
 

1992 births
Living people
Sportspeople from Tokushima Prefecture
Japanese female badminton players
Badminton players at the 2010 Summer Youth Olympics
Badminton players at the 2016 Summer Olympics
Olympic badminton players of Japan
Olympic gold medalists for Japan
Olympic medalists in badminton
Medalists at the 2016 Summer Olympics
Badminton players at the 2014 Asian Games
Badminton players at the 2018 Asian Games
Asian Games gold medalists for Japan
Asian Games silver medalists for Japan
Asian Games bronze medalists for Japan
Asian Games medalists in badminton
Medalists at the 2014 Asian Games
Medalists at the 2018 Asian Games
World No. 1 badminton players
BWF Best Female Player of the Year